Miguel Muñoz (1922–1990) was a Spanish football midfielder and manager.

Miguel Muñoz may also refer to:

 Miguel Muñoz Trophy, football award for team managers in Spanish football
 Hoyos de Miguel Muñoz, municipality in province of Ávila, Spain
 Miguel Muñoz (bishop) (died 1553), Spanish Roman Catholic prelate
 Miguel Ángel Muñoz (born 1983), Spanish actor and singer
 Miki Muñoz (born 1995), Spanish football midfielder for Burgos
 Miguel Muñoz (footballer, born 1996), Spanish football centre-back for Piast Gliwice